The 2022 Hokkaido Bank Curling Classic was held from August 4 to 7 at the Hokkaido Bank Curling Stadium in Sapporo, Japan. It was the first tour event of the 2022–23 curling season. The total purse for the event is ¥ 1,700,000 on both the men's and women's sides.

In the men's final, the 2022 Korean champions Team Jeong Byeong-jin defeated the Yusuke Morozumi rink 7–2 to win the title. Team Jeong, also consisting of Lee Jeong-jae, Kim Min-woo and Kim Tae-hwan went a perfect 5–0 to win the event, finishing first in their pool with a 3–0 record. They then beat the other Korean team skipped by Jeong Yeong-seok in the semifinal to earn their spot in the final game. Team Morozumi suffered one loss to the Jeong rink in the round robin, but were able to defeat Team Hayato Sato in the semifinal to also reach the final. In the third place game, the Jeong Yeong-seok rink won 5–4 over Team Sato. The eight team field was rounded out by the Shinya Abe, Kohsuke Hirata, Masaki Ishikawa and Takumi Maeda rinks.

In the women's final, the defending Pacific-Asia champions Team Sayaka Yoshimura bested Team Mayu Minami 5–4. Team Yoshimura, with third Kaho Onodera, second Anna Ohmiya, lead Mina Kobayashi and alternate Yumie Funayama dropped their opening game to the Ikue Kitazawa rink before winning their next two games to qualify for the playoffs. They then beat the previously undefeated Ha Seung-youn Korean rink to reach the final. Team Minami qualified for the playoffs with a 1–2 record, but were able to upset the Kitazawa rink in their semifinal. The bronze medal game was won by Team Kitazawa in a 6–2 final over Team Ha. The women's field was rounded out by Teams Momoha Tabata, Sae Yamamoto, Miori Nakamura and Honoka Sasaki.

Men

Teams
The teams are listed as follows:

Round-robin standings
Final round-robin standings

Round-robin results
All draw times are listed in Japan Standard Time (UTC+09:00).

Draw 1
Thursday, August 4, 3:30 pm

Draw 3
Friday, August 5, 10:00 am

Draw 5
Friday, August 5, 5:00 pm

Playoffs

Source:

Semifinals
Saturday, August 6, 1:30 pm

Third place game
Sunday, August 7, 10:00 am

Final
Sunday, August 7, 10:00 am

Women

Teams
The teams are listed as follows:

Round-robin standings
Final round-robin standings

Round-robin results
All draw times are listed in Japan Standard Time (UTC+09:00).

Draw 2
Thursday, August 4, 7:00 pm

Draw 4
Friday, August 5, 1:30 pm

Draw 6
Saturday, August 6, 10:00 am

Playoffs

Source:

Semifinals
Saturday, August 6, 5:00 pm

Third place game
Sunday, August 7, 4:00 pm

Final
Sunday, August 7, 4:00 pm

Notes

References

External links
Official Website
Men's Event
Women's Event

2022 in Japanese sport
2022 in curling
August 2022 sports events in Japan
International curling competitions hosted by Japan
Sport in Sapporo